Nassarius coronulus, common name the small crown dog whelk, is a species of sea snail, a marine gastropod mollusc in the family Nassariidae, the Nassa mud snails or dog whelks.

Description
The shell grows to a length of 15 mm.

Distribution
This species occurs in the Red Sea and in the Indian Ocean off Madagascar and the Mascarene Basin.

References

 Cernohorsky W. O. (1984). Systematics of the family Nassariidae (Mollusca: Gastropoda). Bulletin of the Auckland Institute and Museum 14: 1–356.

External links
 

Nassariidae
Gastropods described in 1852